O'Donnell Independent School District is a public school district based in O'Donnell, Texas (USA).  Located in Lynn County, portions of the district extend into Dawson and Terry counties.

In 2009, the school district was rated "academically acceptable" by the Texas Education Agency.

Schools
O'Donnell High School
O'Donnell Elementary School

Special programs

Athletics
O'Donnell High School plays six-man football.

References

External links
O'Donnell ISD

School districts in Lynn County, Texas
School districts in Dawson County, Texas
School districts in Terry County, Texas